Oselvar is a since April 2018 abandoned subsea oil field located  southwest of Stavanger in the southern Norwegian section of the North Sea, close to the British border. Oselvar was discovered in 1991. The field is located at  distance from the Ula field to which it was tied back.
The Oselvar field installations shall be decommissioned by the end of 2022.

Ownership
DNO Norge AS is since 2019 the formal operator of the field with 55% of interest in the project. Production License 274 which covers the area of the field was given in 2002 to then operator DONG. As per 2020 the only other partner is CapeOmega AS (45%). The total development cost was NOK 4.7 billion. 
</ref>

Production

Oselvar was developed with three production wells. Produced oil and gas was transported to the Ula field platform for processing via the Oselvar module. Once processed, the oil was pumped via the Norpipe system to Teesside, UK. Although production was scheduled to start in November 2011, production actually started on April 14, 2012.

See also
Ula oil field
Ekofisk oil field
Norpipe
North Sea oil
Economy of Norway

References

External links
 DONG Energy official website
 Wintershall Norge official website

Oil fields in Norway
North Sea oil fields
Former Ørsted (company) oil and gas fields